Losing It may refer to:

Books
 Losing It (book), a 2008 autobiography by Valerie Bertinelli

Film and TV
 Losing It, a 2006 TV film starring Martin Clunes
 Losing It with John Stamos, an American talk show
Losing It With Jillian, The Biggest Loser spinoff with Jillian Michaels

Music
 "Losing It" (song), by Australian producer Fisher, 2018
"Losing It", song by Rush from the album Signals
"Losing It", song by Kurt Vile & the Violators from the EP The Hunchback, 2009
"Losing It (Song for Abigail)", song by The Boo Radleys from the album Everything's Alright Forever, 1992
"Losing It", song by Robert Pollard from the album Of Course You Are, 2016
"Losing It", track from The Wizard of Lies soundtrack

See also
 Losin' It, 1983 American-Canadian comedy film
 "Losin' It", a 2008 song by Rock City